Annulobalcis albus is a species of sea snail, a marine gastropod mollusc in the family Eulimidae.

Distribution
This species is found off the coasts of Vietnam.

References

External links
 To World Register of Marine Species

Eulimidae
Gastropods described in 2012